Pterolophia izumikurana is a species of beetle in the family Cerambycidae. It was described by Masao Hayashi in 1971.

References

izumikurana
Beetles described in 1971